Uninvented Story is a 1964 Soviet drama film directed by Vladimir Gerasimov.

Plot 
Anatoly and Varya got married, but Anatoly was very jealous. He is jealous of her not only for work, but also for his friend. Unable to bear constant quarrels, Varya goes to the Ural.

Cast 
 Zhanna Prokhorenko as Varya
 Georgi Yepifantsev as Anatoly
 Leonid Kuravlyov as Kostya
 Vitali Doronin as Stepan
 Valentina Berezutskaya as Zhura
 Svetlana Kharitonova

References

External links 
 

1964 films
1960s Russian-language films
Soviet drama films
1964 drama films